Hong Kong Reserve League  is the reserve team league formed by the clubs of Hong Kong Premier League under the organisation of the Hong Kong Football Association.

Competition format
 Each team plays every other team in the league twice, one home and one away game.
 During every match, each team shall have at least six U-20 players on the pitch at any time.
 Since most of the teams do not have a home ground, the matches will be played on different grounds.
 There are no promotion and relegation in the league.

See also
Hong Kong Premier League
The Hong Kong Football Association

References
 League Rules, The Hong Kong Football Association website

 
4
Reserve football leagues